Intramural sports are recreational sports organized within a particular institution, usually an educational institution, or a set geographic region.  The term, which is chiefly North American, derives from the Latin words intra muros meaning "within walls", and was used to describe sports matches and contests that took place among teams from "within the walls" of an institution or area. The term dates to the 1840s. It is contrasted with extramural, varsity or intercollegiate sports, which are played between teams from different educational institutions. The word intermural, which also correctly means "between institutions", is a common error for "intramural".

History

The first intramural sports departments were established at Ohio State University and the University of Michigan in 1913. Elmer Mitchell, a graduate student, at the time, was named the first Director of Intramural Sports at the University of Michigan in 1919 and the first recreational sports facility in the country opened at the University of Michigan. Mitchell is considered the "father of intramural sports" and taught a class in intramural sports taken by William Wasson, founder of the National Intramural Association (NIA), the forerunner to the National Intramural and Recreational Sports Association (NIRSA).

Mitchell later authored Intramural Athletics (ED Mitchell - AS Barnes, 1928), and Intramural Sports.  He  co-authored Intramural Sports with Pat Mueller.

Today, "intramural" tournaments are still organized within a specific community or municipal area, between teams of equivalent age or athletic ability. For example, intramural sports programs are often organized on college campuses to promote competition and fun among the students and teachers sometimes.

For most schools and campuses, intramural sports are used to promote wellness and allow students who do not compete on a national (NCAA) level an opportunity to be active.

In the United States
NIRSA: Leaders in Collegiate Recreation, formerly known as the National Intramural Recreational Sports Association, a professional organization based in Corvallis, Oregon, provides a network of more than 4,500 highly trained professionals, students and Associate Members in the recreational sports field throughout the United States, Canada and other countries. In most of the world outside North America, sports scholarships and college sports on the North American model do not exist so the distinction between college and intramural sports has no relevance and is not made.

In Canada
The Canadian Intramural Recreation Association (CIRA) organized intramurals within Canada
from 1976 to 2002. CIRA Ontario has been the major intramural organization in the Canadian province of Ontario since 1969. CIRA Ontario is an incorporated, non-profit organization whose mission is to encourage, promote, and develop active living, healthy lifestyles and personal growth through intramural and recreation programs within the education and recreation communities. They fulfill their mandate through resources, workshops, conferences, newsletters, awards, and other means.

See also
College club sports in the United States
Physical education class
Team sport

References

Further reading

C. Jensen & S. Overman. Administration and Management of Physical Education and Athletic Programs. 4th edition. Waveland Press, 2003 (Chapter 14, "Intramural Recreation").

College sports in the United States
Terminology used in multiple sports
Student sport